Çukurca is a village in the Baykan District of Siirt Province in Turkey. The village is populated by Kurds of the Çirî tribe and had a population of 273 in 2021.

The hamlets of Aydınlar, Boyluca, Damlacık, Duraklı, Gürbulak and Oğlaklı are attached to Çukurca.

References 

Kurdish settlements in Siirt Province
Villages in Baykan District